Viktor Ujčík (born May 24, 1972) is a Czech professional ice hockey player. He was selected by the Montreal Canadiens in the 9th round (266th overall) of the 2001 NHL Entry Draft.

Ujcik played with HC Vítkovice in the Czech Extraliga during the 2010–11 Czech Extraliga season.

Career statistics

Regular season and playoffs

International

References

External links

1972 births
Czech ice hockey forwards
HC Vítkovice players
Living people
Montreal Canadiens draft picks
Sportspeople from Jihlava
Czechoslovak ice hockey forwards
Czech expatriate ice hockey players in Finland